Game theory is the study of participants' behavior in strategic situations.

Game theory may also refer to:
 Combinatorial game theory, the study of move combinations in games like nim, chess, and go
 Game Theory (band), a 1980s American rock band
 Game Theory (album), a 2006 album by hip-hop band The Roots
 Game Theory (web show), a 2011–present web series by Matthew Patrick
 Political Game Theory, a book by Nolan McCarty with Adam Meirowitz

See also
 Game studies, the discipline of studying games in the context of entertainment and education